The 2006–07 European Challenge Cup was the 11th year of the European Challenge Cup, the second tier rugby union cup competition below the Heineken Cup. The tournament was held between October 2006 and May 2007.

Group stage

Pool 1

Pool 2

Pool 3

Pool 4

Pool 5

Seeding and runners-up

Knockout stage

Quarter-finals

Semi-finals

Final

See also

European Challenge Cup
2006–07 Heineken Cup

References

 
2006-07
2006–07 rugby union tournaments for clubs
2006–07 in European rugby union
2006–07 in Irish rugby union
2006–07 in English rugby union
2006–07 in Welsh rugby union
2006–07 in Scottish rugby union
2006–07 in French rugby union
2006–07 in Italian rugby union